Adoration of the Shepherds is a c.1650 oil on canvas painting by Murillo, now in the Museo del Prado in Madrid. He also produced a later version of the same subject.

References

Murillo
1650 paintings
Paintings by Bartolomé Esteban Murillo in the Museo del Prado